Steven Howse (born September 23, 1975), known professionally as Layzie Bone, is a rapper known primarily for being a member of the group Bone Thugs-n-Harmony. He has also gone by the names L-Burna and The #1 Assassin. He is the younger brother of fellow group member Flesh-N-Bone and cousin of group member Wish Bone. Layzie is also a member of the rap group Bone Brothers and CEO of the record label Harmony Howse Entertainment.

Music career 
The group formed the band B.O.N.E. Enterpri$e (all except for Flesh-N-Bone) and recorded an album entitled Faces of Death in the studio of their then-mentor, Kermit Henderson, on his indie label Stoney Burke in 1993. After this Layzie and the rest of the Bone Family boarded a Greyhound Bus to Los Angeles where they worked with notable producer and rapper Eazy-E and his Ruthless/Relativity Records label. Diego Blak (born Diego Hodge), a marketer and promoter and co-executive producer of Faces of Death, introduced them to Eazy-E at a concert he promoted in Cleveland, Ohio, where they auditioned for him in his dressing room and then traveled back to Los Angeles after the show to seal the deal. At this point Eazy named them Thugs-n-Harmony but they wanted to keep the Bone name so they were called Bone Thugs-N-Harmony.

Solo career, Mo Thugs & Bone Brothers 
Layzie has also promoted the indie label Mo Thugs Records which he and the rest of Bone originated. He released his first solo album Thug By Nature on March 20, 2001, exactly the same day Bizzy Bone released his second solo album, The Gift. He also has collaborative albums with Young Noble from The Outlawz and A.K. of Do or Die, solo albums out such as It's Not A Game, The New Revolution, Cleveland, Startin' from Scratch: How A Thug Was Born, and the upcoming solo album to be announced Ruthless. He has had a series of albums with Bizzy Bone; Still Creepin On Ah Come Up and under the name Bone Brothers entitled: Bone Brothers, Bone Brothers 2, Bone Brothers 3. In the fall of 2010, Layzie established a new label, Harmony Howse Entertainment. As of 2011, he and Fredro Starr of the Onyx group are planning to release a collaborative EP entitled FireSquad, which is set to be released late 2011. By the middle of 2013, Layzie has announced on Twitter that he is taking a step aside from performing and appearing with Bone Thugs-n-Harmony to focus on his solo-career. He's the uncle of the independent rapper, Dizzy Wright.

Layzie is currently working on his latest album Perfect Timing, scheduled to be released on April 20, 2016, now TBD, Layzie releases Cleveland is The City Featuring Aaron "D-Boyy" Dissell. The song was used by Fox News during the 2015 NBA Finals as the Cleveland Cavaliers theme song.
On July 6, 2020, Layzie Bone released his new album titled Wanted Dead or Alive featuring Krayzie Bone, Flesh-N-Bone, Dame Dolla, Willy Ray, Cyrano ESQ, Maybach Dice, Paul Zero, Dame Dolla, Stew Deez, Ken Dawg, Ebony Burks.

Discography

Studio albums 
Thug by Nature (2001)
The New Revolution (2006)
Cleveland (2006)
Thugz Nation (2008)
The Definition (2011)
The Meaning (2011)
Annihilation (2019)
Lost & Found (2019)
Wanted Dead or Alive (2020)

Collaboration albums 
Bone Brothers with Bone Brothers (2005)
Thug Brothers with Young Noble (2006)
Bone Brothers 2 with Bone Brothers (2007)
Bone Brothers III with Bone Brothers (2008)
Still Creepin on Ah Come Up with Bone Brothers (2008)
Finally with A.K. (2008)
Thug Twinz with Big Sloan (2009)

References

External links 
Layzie Bone

1975 births
Living people
African-American male rappers
American male rappers
American hip hop singers
Bone Thugs-n-Harmony members
Rappers from Cleveland
Gangsta rappers
21st-century American rappers
21st-century American male musicians
21st-century African-American musicians
20th-century African-American people